Tsugumi Sakurai is a Japanese freestyle wrestler. She is a two-time gold medalist at the World Wrestling Championships (2021 and 2022). She also won the gold medal in her event at the 2022 Asian Wrestling Championships held in Ulaanbaatar, Mongolia.

Career 

She won the gold medal in the women's 55kg event at the 2021 World Wrestling Championships held in Oslo, Norway. She also won the gold medal in her event at the 2022 Asian Wrestling Championships held in Ulaanbaatar, Mongolia.

She won the gold medal in the women's 57kg event at the 2022 World Wrestling Championships held in Belgrade, Serbia.

Achievements

References

External links
 

Living people
2001 births
Sportspeople from Kōchi Prefecture
Japanese female sport wrestlers
World Wrestling Championships medalists
Asian Wrestling Championships medalists
21st-century Japanese women